Coals of Fire is a 1918 American drama silent film directed by Victor Schertzinger and written by R. Cecil Smith. The film stars Enid Bennett, Fred Niblo, Melbourne MacDowell, William Elmer, Virginia Southern and J. P. Lockney. The film was released on August 26, 1918, by Paramount Pictures.

Plot
The young Nell Bradley is regarded with contempt by the inhabitants of the town where she lives because her father is the owner of the local bar, seen as a place of perdition for alcoholics. Charles Alden, the pastor, is attracted to the girl but, when a minor gets sick because a traveling salesman makes her drunk, Alden holds Nell responsible for the fact, even though she has managed to save her with his intervention. Later, Alden discovers the truth. He then offers to send the young woman to school and promises to wait for her until she completes her studies.

Cast
Enid Bennett as Nell Bradley
Fred Niblo as Rev. Charles Alden
Melbourne MacDowell as James Bradley
William Elmer as Ben Roach 
Virginia Southern as Amy Robinson
J. P. Lockney as Steve Morrow
Donald MacDonald as Charles Read

References

External links 
 

1918 films
1910s English-language films
Silent American drama films
1918 drama films
Paramount Pictures films
Films directed by Victor Schertzinger
American black-and-white films
American silent feature films
1910s American films